State Route 94 (SR 94) is a secondary state highway located in central Maine. SR 94 is an east–west highway.

Route description
SR 94 begins in the west at an intersection with SR 7 just south of downtown Dexter, where SR 7 connects with SR 23.  The highway is the most direct connection between the towns of Dexter and Corinth, and is the lone route serving the town center of Garland, which SR 94 passes through without any major crossings.  After passing through Garland, SR 94 turns southeast, where it enters the town limits of Corinth and ends at an intersection with SR 11/SR 43. These routes provide a connection SR 15 near the town center,  to the east. SR 11/SR 43 (via SR 7) also provide a connection between Dexter and Corinth (via Corinna and Exeter) to the south, but is a much longer, meandering route than SR 94.

Junction list

References

External links

Floodgap Roadgap's RoadsAroundME: Maine State Route 94

094
Transportation in Penobscot County, Maine